Lug Valley  is a valley in the Kullu District of the Himalayan region in the state of Himachal Pradesh, India.

For the last 150 years, the people of the valley have been  forest contractors in extracting timber from the forest. Today, the main forest contractors in the Himalayan region are still found in the Lug valley.

The Lug valley in Kullu  is reportedly  the place where the concept of using cables and trolleys for transportation was first employed by the British Forest Department to transport timber out of Himachal Pradesh forests in the early twentieth century.

Notes

External links
Himachal Pradesh articles in The India Tribune
Relevance of Ropeways for Uttaranchal

Valleys of Himachal Pradesh
Geography of Kullu district